Portrait of an Unknown Woman is a 1954 West German comedy film directed by Helmut Käutner and starring Ruth Leuwerik, O. W. Fischer and Irene von Meyendorff.

It was shot at the Bavaria Studios in Munich and on location in Madrid and Paris. The film's sets were designed by the art directors Ludwig Reiber and Max Seefelder.

Synopsis
A potential scandal breaks out when an artists adds the head of the wife of a diplomat to a nude painting he is working on.

Cast

References

Bibliography

External links 

1954 films
1954 romantic comedy films
German romantic comedy films
West German films
Films directed by Helmut Käutner
Adultery in films
Films about divorce
Films about fictional painters
Films shot at Bavaria Studios
1950s German-language films
German black-and-white films
1950s German films